Alfreda Bosworth Withington (15 August 1860 – 1 October 1951) was an American physician and author.

Life
Withington was born in Germantown, Pennsylvania, where her father, James Hervey Withington, was headmaster of Germantown Academy. She was named for her mother, Alfreda Bosworth. She attended Cornell University in Ithaca, New York from 1877 to 1881. She then interned at the New York Infirmary for Women and Children, but was refused a position at the Infirmary, as none of the directors would agree to let her take the entrance examination. At the age of 63, she obtained a Kentucky medical license and traveled to work as a medical settlement physician for 7 years, between 1924 and 1931, ordinarily making calls on horseback. Withington wrote her memoir titled Mine Eyes Have Seen in 1941. On October 1, 1951, she died and was buried in Pittsfield, Massachusetts.

References

1860 births
1951 deaths
20th-century American physicians
American women physicians
Cornell University alumni
Physicians from New York (state)
Physicians from Kentucky
American memoirists
American women memoirists
20th-century American women